Emiljano Shehu (born 10 June 1998) is an Albanian professional footballer who plays as a defender for Greek Super League 2 club Almopos Aridea.

Club career

Early career

Platanias
Shehu participated for the first time with Platanias first team on 24 September 2014 in a 2014–15 Greek Cup match against Serres where he managed to make his first senior debut playing as a starter in the 3–1 victory in which he substituted off in the 55th minute for Kostas Mendrinos.

International career
Shehu was called up for the first time in international level at the Albania national under-19 football team by coach Altin Lala for the double Friendly match against Bosnia and Herzegovina U19 on 21 & 23 April 2015. He debuted for the Albania U19 on 21 April in a 3–0 loss.

Career statistics

Club

References

External links

1998 births
Living people
Footballers from Chania
Greek people of Albanian descent
Association football defenders
Albanian footballers
Albania youth international footballers
Platanias F.C. players
Luftëtari Gjirokastër players
Kavala F.C. players
Episkopi F.C. players
O.F. Ierapetra F.C. players
Almopos Aridea F.C. players
Super League Greece players
Gamma Ethniki players
Super League Greece 2 players
Kategoria Superiore players
Albanian expatriate footballers
Albanian expatriate sportspeople in Greece
Expatriate footballers in Greece